Omega Christian Television is a Christian television station founded by Eiríkur Sigurbjörnsson (A.K.A. Erik Erikson) which started broadcasting on 28 July 1992. Initially it only broadcast in Iceland but it has since expanded its coverage to a large part of Europe.  It broadcasts in the United Kingdom on Sky as The Gospel Channel. The programmes include well-known evangelical preachers and self acclaimed faith healers such as Peter Popoff and Benny Hinn.

Trinity Broadcasting Network 
By 1994, Trinity Broadcasting Network had partnered with Omega Christian Television boosting the 10-watt station to 1000-watts "overnight."

References

External links
Omega TV home page
The Gospel Channel

Christian mass media companies
Television channels in Iceland
Christianity in Iceland
Christian mass media in the United Kingdom
Television channels and stations established in 1992
Companies based in Reykjavík
Christian organizations based in Europe